Enkephalinases are enzymes that degrade endogenous enkephalin opioid peptides. They include:

 Aminopeptidase N (APN)
 Neutral endopeptidase (NEP)
 Dipeptidyl peptidase 3 (DPP3)
 Carboxypeptidase A6 (CPA6)
 Leucyl/cystinyl aminopeptidase (LNPEP)
 Angiotensin-converting enzyme (ACE)

See also
 Enkephalinase inhibitor
 Oxytocinase

References

Hydrolases
Human proteins
Nociception